Sture Fladmark (born 30 June 1967) is a Norwegian football manager and a former player.

Player career
He played for Aalesunds and Lyn.

Managing career
He led Lyn to bronze medals in the Norwegian Premier League in 2002. He also won the Kniksen award as coach of the year in 2002. He also was the assistant manager for South Africa national football team under Stuart Baxter. He also coached IL Hødd and is currently in Skarbøvik IF.

Honours
Kniksen Award as Coach of the year: 2002

References

Living people
1967 births
Norwegian footballers
Aalesunds FK players
Lyn Fotball players
Norwegian football managers
Lyn Fotball managers
Kniksen Award winners

Association football midfielders